Iraq sent a delegation to compete at the 2008 Summer Paralympics in Beijing. Twenty Iraqis qualified to compete in the Games, in fields including powerlifting, athletics, and volleyball.

Medalists
The country won two medals, a silver and a bronze.

Sports

Athletics

Powerlifting

Men

Women

Volleyball

The men's volleyball team didn't win any medals; they were 7th out of 8 teams.

Players
Saeed Al Mimar
Salah Al Shammari
Hussain Al Ugbi
Naser Alaibi
Ahmed Dahash
Muayad Hattab
Hadi Juboori
Majeed Kaabi
Mahdi Khayoon
Majeed Majeed
Abdulmunem Mohmmed
Ahmed Whailani

Tournament

5th-8th classification

7th-8th classification

See also
2008 Summer Paralympics
Iraq at the Paralympics
Iraq at the 2008 Summer Olympics

External links
Beijing 2008 Paralympic Games Official Site
International Paralympic Committee

References

Nations at the 2008 Summer Paralympics
2008
Paralympics